Białe Błota  is a village in Bydgoszcz County, Kuyavian-Pomeranian Voivodeship, in north-central Poland. It is the seat of the gmina (administrative district) called Gmina Białe Błota.

The village has a population of 5,775.

References

Villages in Bydgoszcz County